Brun, Brün or de Brún is a surname. Notable people with the surname include:

 Ane Brun (born 1976), Norwegian singer/songwriter
 Bairbre de Brún (born 1954), Irish politician
 Charles Brun (France) (1821–1897), French Navy engineer and politician
 Charles Brun (Denmark) (1866–1919), Danish politician
 Eske Brun (1904–1987), politician in Greenland
 Frédéric Brun (writer) (born 1960), French writer
 Friederike Brun (1765–1835), Danish author and salonist
 Herbert Brün (1918–2000), German-American composer of electronic music
 Johan Nordahl Brun (1745–1816), Norwegian poet, dramatist, bishop, and politician
 Johanne Brun (1874–1954), Danish opera singer
 Johannes Brun (1832-1890), Norwegian stage actor
 Johannes Brun (officer) (1891-1977), Norwegian military officer and bridge champion
 Joseph C. Brun (1907-1998), French-American cinematographer 
 Marie-Marguerite Brun (1713–1794), French lexicographer and poet
 Pádraig de Brún (1889–1960), Irish clergyman, mathematician and classical scholar
 Philippe Brun (musician) (1908–1994), French jazz trumpeter
 Philippe Brun (politician) (born 1991), French politician
 Roy Brun (born 1953), American judge and politician
 Rudolf Brun (1290s–1360), leader of the Zürich guilds' revolution of 1336 and the city's first independent mayor
 Thomas Brun, 12th century clerk of King Henry I of England and almoner of King Henry II
 Viggo Brun (1885–1978), Norwegian professor and mathematician
 Walter Brun (born 1942), Swiss former racing driver and founder of Brun Motorsport, an auto racing team

See also
 Brunn (surname)
 Brunne, a surname
 Lebrun, a list of people with the surname or given name

French-language surnames